Bubba Jenkins (born February 5, 1988) is an American mixed martial artist and former amateur wrestler. He currently competes in the featherweight division of Professional Fighters League. He has also notably competed for Bellator MMA, Absolute Championship Berkut and Brave Combat Federation, where he was a former champion. As an amateur wrestler, Jenkins was a freestyle junior World Champion and an NCAA Division I champion.

Wrestling

High school
Jenkins attended Cox High School for three years before transferring to First Colonial High School as a senior, where he won a VHSL state wrestling championship and a National High School Coaches Association (NHSCA) Senior National Championship.

College
In 2006, Jenkins committed to the Penn State Nittany Lions.

2006-07
Freshman: Competing at 157 pounds, Jenkins went 23-12 during regular season. Post-season, he placed sixth at the Big Ten Conference with 3 victories and 3 defeats. in which he went 1–2 at the 157-pounds division.

2007-08
Sophomore: Before the season started, Jenkins won a gold medal at the Junior World Championships in freestyle at 66 kilograms. Competed at 149 pounds in college, during the season he downed the accomplished Jordan Burroughs in a close 3-2 ending match. Went 2–2 at the Big Ten's, downing Lance Palmer twice and losing to Brent Metcalf and Josh Churella, placing fifth and going to the NCAA's where he did exceptionally well going 4-1 and becoming the runner-up.

2008-09
Junior: Finished the regular season with an undefeated 22–0 record. Went 2-0 prior to the finals at the Big Ten Championship, where he suffered an injury and was forced to forfeit and earn runner-up honors. At the NCAA's, Jenkins was notably affected by the injury and had a tough 0–2 run at the tournament.

2009-10
Redshirt: Jenkins redshirted this season because of athletic and academic issues.

2010-11
Senior: When Cael Sanderson arrived as the new head coach at PSU, Jenkins didn't feel comfortable with the way of teaching of Sanderson and Sanderson felt uncomfortable with the style of Jenkins. This caused him to transfer to Arizona State University. In his first and only year with the Sun Devils, Jenkins captured an NCAA title by pinning previously unbeaten Nittany Lion and future World Champion and Olympic gold medalist David Taylor in the finals. Jenkins graduated as an NCAA champion, two-time finalist and two-time All-American.

Appearances post-career

2013 
Jenkins wrestled two-time NCAA champion (2011 and 2013) Jordan Oliver in a folkstyle match on November 1–3, at the 2013 Who's Number One dual meet. He lost the match by points (2-8).

Jenkins was scheduled to wrestle against Kyle Dake in a freestyle match on December 1 at the 2013 Grapple at the Garden event. However, Dake pulled out due to an injury suffered while competing and was replaced by 2012 NCAA champion Frank Molinaro, in a folkstyle match instead. Jenkins defeated his former teammate by points (4-2).

2020 
After 7 years of no competition, Jenkins faced highly competitive wrestler Jason Nolf in a freestyle match on October 20, as a headliner for the NLWC Event II. He was defeated by technical fall in the first period.

Mixed martial arts career
Jenkins made his mixed martial arts debut in the Lightweight division on December 2, 2011 at Tachi Palace Fights 11: Redemption. Jenkins defeated Josh Williams by submission TKO in the first round. Jenkins returned for his second fight at Tachi Palace Fights 12: Second Coming on March 9, 2010 He defeated Chris Gomez via rear-naked choke in the first round.

Bubba Jenkins is managed by Daniel A. Martinez of Di-Cypher & Associates.

Resurrection Fighting Alliance
One week before Bubba Jenkins defeated  Chris Gomez at Tachi Palace Fights 12 - Second Coming, he signed an exclusive 6-fight deal with Resurrection Fighting Alliance (RFA).

On June 30, 2012, Jenkins made his promotional debut for the RFA against highly decorated amateur boxer Jesus Adame at RFA 3 - Stevenson vs. Cochrane. Jenkins quickly slammed Adame to the ground and submitted him via Rear Naked Choke at 1:08 of the first round.

The Ultimate Fighter 17: Coaching staff
On October 31, 2012, it was announced that Jenkins joined Jon Jones' coaching staff on the seventeenth season of the UFC produced reality television show The Ultimate Fighter. The first episode of The Ultimate Fighter: Team Jones vs. Team Sonnen premiered on Tuesday, January 22, 2013 at 8 ET/PT on FX Networks.

Bellator MMA
On May 31, 2013, Bellator MMA announced they had signed Jenkins to a long term promotional agreement and he will make his debut in the summer.

Jenkins took on Mike Barreras at Bellator 97.  He won the fight via TKO in the second round.

Jenkins returned to the Bellator cage at Bellator 100 against LaRue Burley on September 20, 2013. He suffered the first defeat of his professional MMA career as he was stopped by Burley via strikes in the third round.

The following November, Jenkins would defeat Ian Rammel due to strikes in the third round at Bellator 109.

Jenkins then faced Sean Powers at Bellator 114 on March 28, 2014. Jenkins won via unanimous decision.

On July 25, 2014, Jenkins faced Poppies Martinez at Bellator 122. Jenkins defeated Martinez via strikes at 4:10 in the first round.

Jenkins faced Thiago Meller at Bellator 126 on September 26, 2014 in Phoenix, Arizona. He won the fight via unanimous decision.

After moving from the Bellator Lightweight division to Featherweight, Jenkins faced former WSOF Featherweight Champion Georgi Karakhanyan on January 16, 2015 at Bellator 132. He lost the fight via technical submission in the first round.

Jenkins faced Joe Wilk on June 26, 2015 at Bellator 139. He won the fight via TKO in the second round.

Jenkins faced Jordan Parsons on November 20, 2015 at Bellator 146.  He won the fight via split decision.

Jenkins then faced Georgi Karakhanyan a rematch at Bellator 160 on August 26, 2016 at a catchweight of 150lbs. because Karakhanyan failed to make weight. Jenkins made the weight. He was favored to win the rematch, but Karakhanyan won, this time at 150lbs., via knock out the first minute into the first round.

Absolute Championship Berkut

After signed a contract with the ACB Jenkins faced with Ali Bagov on 11 March 2017 at ACB 54. He lost the fight by technical submission in the second round.

In the second fight he beat Diego Marlon on 23 September 2017 at ACB 70 via knockout in the third round.

Brave CF
On July 27, 2018 it was announced that Jenkins had signed a multi-fight contract with Brave Combat Federation. Jenkins made his promotional debut against the reigning featherweight champion Elias Boudegzdame at Brave CF 16 on September 21, 2018. Jenkins won the fight via unanimous decision and became the champion.

On July 25, 2019, Jenkins successfully defended his featherweight title by first-round TKO against Lucas Martins at Brave CF 24.

Professional Fighters League

2021 season 
In March 2020, Jenkins signed with Professional Fighters League. Jenkins faced former collegiate wrestling rival Lance Palmer in his promotional debut, on April 23, 2021 at PFL 1. He won the bout via unanimous decision.

Jenkins was scheduled to face Anthony Dizy at PFL 4 on June 10, 2021. However, on May 24, it was announced that Dizy had to pull out of the bout and was replaced by Bobby Moffett. Jenkins won the bout via unanimous decision.

Jenkins faced Chris Wade in the Semifinals off the Featherweight tournament on August 27, 2021 at PFL 9. He lost the bout via unanimous decision.

2022 season 
Jenkins was scheduled to face Sung Bin Jo on April 28, 2022 at PFL 2. After Jo Sungbin pulled out of the bout, he was replaced by Kyle Bochniak. He won the bout via unanimous decision.

Jenkins was scheduled to face Saba Bolaghi on June 24, 2022 at PFL 5. However Bolaghi pulled out of the bout and was replaced by Reinaldo Ekson. Jenkins won the bout via unanimous decision.

Jenkins faced Ryoji Kudo in the Semifinals off the Featherweight tournament on August 13, 2022 at PFL 8. He won the bout via rear-naked choke in the first round.

Jenkins faced Brendan Loughnane in the finals of the Featherweight tournament on November 25, 2022 at PFL 10. He lost the bout via TKO stoppage in the fourth round.

2023 season 
Jenkins will start of the 2023 season in a rematch against Chris Wade on April 1, 2023 at PFL 1.

Championships and accomplishments

Collegiate wrestling
National Collegiate Athletic Association
NCAA Division I All-American out of Pennsylvania State University (2008) and Arizona State University (2011)
NCAA Division I 149 lb: Runner-up out of Pennsylvania State University (2008)
NCAA Division I 157 lb: Champion out of Arizona State University (2011)
Big Ten Conference
B1G 149 lb: Sixth placer out of Pennsylvania State University (2007)
B1G 149 lb: Runner-up out of Pennsylvania State University (2009)

Mixed martial arts record

|-
|Loss
|align=center|19–6
|Brendan Loughnane
|TKO (punches)
|PFL 10
|
|align=center|4
|align=center|2:38
|New York City, New York, United States
|
|-
|Win
|align=center|19–5
|Ryoji Kudo
|Submission (rear-naked choke)
|PFL 9
|
|align=center|1
|align=center|1:49
|London, England
|
|-
|Win
|align=center|18–5
|Reinaldo Ekson
|Decision (unanimous)
|PFL 5
|
|align=center|3
|align=center|5:00
|Atlanta, Georgia, United States
|
|-
|Win
|align=center|17–5
|Kyle Bochniak
|Decision (unanimous)
|PFL 2
|
|align=center|3
|align=center|5:00
|Arlington, Texas, United States
|
|-
|Loss
|align=center|16–5
|Chris Wade
|Decision (unanimous)
|PFL 9 
|
|align=center|3
|align=center|5:00
|Hollywood, Florida, United States
|
|-
|Win
|align=center|16–4
|Bobby Moffett
|Decision (unanimous)
|PFL 4 
|
|align=center|3
|align=center|5:00
|Atlantic City, New Jersey, United States
|
|-
|Win
|align=center|15–4
|Lance Palmer
|Decision (unanimous)
|PFL 1 
|
|align=center|3
|align=center|5:00
|Atlantic City, New Jersey, United States
|
|-
| Win
| align=center| 14–4
| Lucas Martins
| TKO (punches)
| Brave CF 24
| 
| align=center| 1
| align=center| 2:48
| London, England
| 
|-
| Win
| align=center| 13–4
| Elias Boudegzdame
| Decision (unanimous)
| Brave CF 16
| 
| align=center| 5
| align=center| 5:00
| Abu Dhabi, UAE
| 
|-
| Win
| align=center| 12–4
| Diego Marlon
| KO (punches)
| |ACB 70: The Battle of Britain
| 
| align=center| 3
| align=center| 0:44
| Sheffield, England
|
|-
| Loss
| align=center| 11–4
|Ali Bagov
| Technical Submission (inverted triangle choke)
| |ACB 54: Supersonic
| 
| align=center| 2
| align=center| 4:01
| Manchester, England
|
|-
| Loss
| align=center| 11–3
| Georgi Karakhanyan
| KO (punch)
| Bellator 160
| 
| align=center| 1
| align=center| 0:53
| Anaheim, California, United States
| 
|-
| Win
| align=center| 11–2
| Goiti Yamauchi
| Decision (unanimous)
| Bellator 151
| 
| align=center| 3
| align=center| 5:00
| Thackerville, Oklahoma, United States
| 
|-
| Win
| align=center| 10–2
| Jordan Parsons
| Decision (split)
| Bellator 146
| 
| align=center| 3
| align=center| 5:00
| Thackerville, Oklahoma, United States
| 
|-
| Win
| align=center| 9–2
| Joe Wilk
| TKO (punches)
| Bellator 139
| 
| align=center| 2
| align=center| 1:00
| Mulvane, Kansas, United States
| 
|-
| Loss
| align=center| 8–2
| Georgi Karakhanyan
| Technical Submission (guillotine choke)
| Bellator 132
| 
| align=center| 1
| align=center| 1:49
| Temecula, California, United States
| 
|-
| Win
| align=center| 8–1
| Thiago Meller
| Decision (unanimous)
| Bellator 126
| 
| align=center| 3
| align=center| 5:00
| Phoenix, Arizona, United States
| 
|-
| Win
| align=center| 7–1
| Poppies Martinez
| TKO (punches)
| Bellator 122
| 
| align=center| 1
| align=center| 4:10
| Temecula, California, United States
| 
|-
| Win
| align=center| 6–1
| Sean Powers
| Decision (unanimous)
| Bellator 114
| 
| align=center| 3
| align=center| 5:00
| West Valley City, Utah, United States
| 
|-
| Win
| align=center| 5–1
| Ian Rammel
| TKO (punches)
| Bellator 109
| 
| align=center| 3
| align=center| 2:38
| Bethlehem, Pennsylvania, United States
| 
|-
| Loss
| align=center| 4–1
| LaRue Burley
| TKO (punches)
| Bellator 100
| 
| align=center| 3
| align=center| 3:40
| Phoenix, Arizona, United States
| 
|-
| Win
| align=center| 4–0
| Mike Barreras
| TKO (punches)
| Bellator 97
| 
| align=center| 2
| align=center| 1:05
| Rio Rancho, New Mexico, United States
| 
|-
| Win
| align=center| 3–0
| Jesus Adame
| Submission (rear naked choke)
| RFA 3: Stevenson vs. Cochrane
| 
| align=center| 1
| align=center| 1:08
| Kearney, Nebraska, United States
| 
|-
| Win
| align=center| 2–0
| Chris Gomez
| Submission (rear naked choke)
| TPF 12: Second Coming
| 
| align=center| 1
| align=center| 2:07
| Lemoore, California, United States
| 
|-
| Win
| align=center| 1–0
| Josh Williams
| Submission (strikes)
| TPF 11: Redemption
| 
| align=center| 1
| align=center| 2:04
| Lemoore, California, United States
|

NCAA record

! colspan="8"| NCAA Championships Matches
|-
!  Res.
!  Record
!  Opponent
!  Score
!  Date
!  Event
|-
! style=background:white colspan=6 |2011 NCAA Championships  at 157 lbs
|-
|Win
|10-5
|align=left|David Taylor
|style="font-size:88%"|Fall
|style="font-size:88%" rowspan=5|March 20, 2011
|style="font-size:88%" rowspan=5|2011 NCAA Division I Wrestling Championships
|-
|Win
|9-5
|align=left|Jason Welch
|style="font-size:88%"|4-1
|-
|Win
|8-5
|align=left|Paul Young
|style="font-size:88%"|4-3
|-
|Win
|7-5
|align=left|Mark Lewandowski
|style="font-size:88%"|Fall
|-
|Win
|6-5
|align=left|Alex Medved
|style="font-size:88%"|MD 16-5
|-
! style=background:white colspan=6 |2009 NCAA Championships at 149 lbs
|-
|Loss
|5-5
|align=left|David Jauregui
|style="font-size:88%"|MD 1-10
|style="font-size:88%" rowspan=2|March 19, 2009
|style="font-size:88%" rowspan=2|2009 NCAA Division I Wrestling Championships
|-
|-
|Loss
|5-4
|align=left|Matt Fittery
|style="font-size:88%"|6-12
|-
! style=background:white colspan=6 |2008 NCAA Championships  at 149 lbs
|-
|Loss
|5-3
|align=left|Brent Metcalf
|style="font-size:88%"|8-14
|style="font-size:88%" rowspan=5|March 22, 2008
|style="font-size:88%" rowspan=5|2008 NCAA Division I Wrestling Championships
|-
|Win
|5-2
|align=left|Darrion Caldwell
|style="font-size:88%"|12-8
|-
|Win
|4-2
|align=left|J.P O'Connor
|style="font-size:88%"|5-3
|-
|Win
|3-2
|align=left|Ryan Lang
|style="font-size:88%"|4-3
|-
|Win
|2-2
|align=left|Bryce Saddoris
|style="font-size:88%"|Major 15-5
|-
! style=background:white colspan=6 |2007 NCAA Championships at 157 lbs
|-
|Loss
|1-2
|align=left|Seth Martin
|style="font-size:88%"|Fall
|style="font-size:88%" rowspan=3|March 15, 2007
|style="font-size:88%" rowspan=3|2007 NCAA Division I Wrestling Championships
|-
|-
|Loss
|1-1
|align=left|James Strouse
|style="font-size:88%"|0-4
|-
|Win
|1-0
|align=left|Michael Chandler
|style="font-size:88%"|MD 15-3
|-

See also
 List of current PFL fighters
 List of male mixed martial artists

References

External links
 Bubba Jenkins at PFL
 

1988 births
Living people
American male mixed martial artists
Mixed martial artists utilizing collegiate wrestling
Mixed martial artists utilizing freestyle wrestling
American male sport wrestlers
Arizona State Sun Devils wrestlers
Penn State Nittany Lions wrestlers
People from Coconut Creek, Florida
African-American sport wrestlers
Sportspeople from Virginia Beach, Virginia
Mixed martial artists from Virginia